Carlo Cozza (c. 1700–1769) was an Italian painter, the son of  Giovanni Battista Cozza (1676-1742). He was born and died in Ferrara. He trained under his father, and painted mainly for the churches of his native city. In the Chiesa Nuova is a picture by him of the Annunciation; in the church of Santa Lucia of  'St. Anthony the Abbot''; and in San Matteo of 'St. Francis of Paola’‘.

References

1700s births
1769 deaths
18th-century Italian painters
Italian male painters
Painters from Ferrara
18th-century Italian male artists